Phantasia is a role-playing game published by Bantam/Spectra in 1988.

Description
Phantasia is a guide to the world of Margaret Weis and Tracy Hickman's Darksword novels that includes the rules to a simple fantasy system. Characters are defined by only five attributes: Combat, Prowess, Information, Shape, and Life. The game includes rules for movement, combat, and magic; background on the world of Thimhallan; statistics for important characters from the novels; and scenarios written in story form. The resolution mechanics are based on a hand-signal system.

Publication history
The game was designed by Margaret Weis and Tracy Hickman, and published as the book Darksword Adventures by Bantam/Spectra in 1988, with a cover by Larry Elmore.

Reception

References

Fantasy role-playing games
Role-playing games based on novels
Role-playing games introduced in 1988